"(Don't) Give Hate A Chance" is the third and final single from British funk and acid jazz band Jamiroquai's sixth studio album, Dynamite (2005). The title is a reference to the song "Give Peace a Chance" by John Lennon, and was written by Jason Kay, Rob Harris and Matt Johnson. It was produced by Kay and Mike Spencer. The single was released on 7 November 2005, peaking on the UK Singles Chart at number 27.

Music video

The video for "(Don't) Give Hate a Chance" is Jamiroquai's only computer-animated music video and pays homage to the Italian cartoon La Linea. 

Here in the video, an animated version of Jay Kay himself (resembling Mr. Linea from the aforementioned show) sings and dances as it cuts to scenes with humanoids (who also resemble the same character) make war references. It also feature the hand from said show and even animated gorillas.

An alternate video released in late October, which included the ground being replaced by plants and rocks and significant changes to the final minute of the video.

To promote the release of the video, Sony BMG organised the video to be projected on a number of outdoor venues around central London, including the walls of the Chelsea Barracks military grounds and a car park in the Soho district.

Track listing
UK CD1
 "(Don't) Give Hate A Chance" – 3:50
 "(Don't) Give Hate A Chance" (Steve Mac Classic Radio Edit) – 5:04

References

Jamiroquai songs
2005 singles
2005 songs
Anti-war songs
Protest songs
Songs against racism and xenophobia
Songs written by Jason Kay
Songs written by Matt Johnson (keyboardist)
Sony BMG singles